I Hope So (stylized as I hope so) is the twenty first studio album by Japanese singer Akina Nakamori and second studio album to be released during the 2000s. It was released on 14 May 2003 under the Universal Music Japan label. The album includes the lead single "Days".

The album includes four of Akina's original written songs: "Niji", "I Hope So", "Veil" and "Days".

Promotion

Singles
It consists of one previously released single.

"Days" is the forty second single written by Nakamori herself and Oda Tetsuro. It was released on 30 April 2003 under Universal Music Japan. It was her only single to be released in that year. The single was promoted as an ending theme to the Japanese television drama Onna to Ai to Mystery. The single was included in the compilation album Best Finger 25th anniversary selection and All Time Best: Originals.

The single debuted at number 30 on Oricon Single Weekly Charts.

Stage performances
"Days", "Utsutsu no Hana", "Tsumugi Uta" and "Kaze no Hate" has been performed in the anniversary live tour Akina Nakamori 2003: I Hope So.

"I Hope So" has been performed in the one-night special live AKINA NAKAMORI Special Live 2009 “Empress at Yokohama”.

Chart performance
The album reached number 15 on the Oricon Album Weekly Chart charted for the 6 consecutive weeks with the sales of 18,000 copies.

Track listing
All tracks are arranged by Satoshi Takebe.

References

2003 albums
Japanese-language albums
Akina Nakamori albums
Universal Music Japan albums